Martina Koch may refer to:

Martina Koch (golfer) (born 1965), German professional golfer
Martina Hallmen (born 1959), née Koch, German field hockey player